Agile architecture means how enterprise architects, system architects and software architects apply architectural practice in agile software development. A number of commentators have identified a tension between traditional software architecture and agile methods along the axis of adaptation (leaving architectural decisions until the last possible moment) versus anticipation (planning in advance) (Kruchten, 2010 ).

Waterman, Nobel and Allan (2015) explored the tensions between spending too little time designing an up-front architecture, increasing risk, and spending too much time, negatively impacting of the delivery of value to the customer. They identify six forces that can affect agile architecture: Requirements instability, technical risk, early value, team culture, customer agility and experience. These forces may be addressed by six strategies: Respond to change, address risk, emergent architecture, big design up front and use frameworks and template architectures.

Several attempts have been made to specify what makes up an agile approach to architecture. According to the SAFe framework, the principles of agile architecture are:
 Design emerges. Architecture is a collaboration. (intentional architecture)
 The bigger the system, the longer the runway (architectural runway)
 Build the simplest architecture that can possibly work (established design principles)
 When in doubt, code or model it out (spikes, prototype, domain and use case models)
 They build it, they test it (design for testability)
 There is no monopoly on innovation (teams, hackathons) - Facebook's Like button was conceived as part of a hackathon
 Implement architectural flow (architectural epics and the portfolio kanban) - the portfolio Kanban goes through funnel, review, analysis, portfolio backlog and implementing
At the enterprise architecture level, Scott Ambler (2016) proposes the following principles
 Evolutionary collaboration over blueprinting
 Communication over perfection
 Active stakeholder participation
 Enterprise architects are active participants on development teams
 Enablement over inspection (exemplars)
 High level models (the more complex, the more abstract)
 Capture details with working code
 Lean guidance and rules, not bureaucratic procedures
 Have a dedicated team of experienced enterprise architects

Svyatoslav Kotusev identifies the following dimensions of "agile" Enterprise Architecture:
 Agility of strategic planning, including such aspects as (a) the overall amount of time and effort devoted to strategic planning, (b) the organizational scope covered by strategic planning, (c) the time horizon of strategic planning and (d) how exactly the desired future is defined
 Agility of initiative delivery, including such aspects as (a) the logical flow of initiative delivery and (b) the volume of EA artifacts developed for initiatives, i.e. solution overviews and solution designs
 Agility of finance allocation, including such aspects as (a) the composition of corporate IT investment portfolios and (b) the structure of budgeting processes
 Agility of architecture governance, including such aspects as (a) the formality of decision-making processes and (b) the adherence to the approved plans
 Agility of architecture function, including such aspects as (a) the ratio of architects in the total IT workforce and (b) the degree of participation of architects in IT projects
 Agility of other elements, including such aspects as (a) the level of technical standardization and (b) the sophistication of utilized software tools

References 

Architectural theory
Agile software development